James Philip Eagle (August 10, 1837December 20, 1904) was an American politician who served as speaker of the Arkansas House and as the 16th governor of Arkansas, a Baptist minister, and president of the Southern Baptist Convention.

Biography
Eagle was born in Maury County, Tennessee. His family moved to Arkansas early in his life and he was educated in the public schools. He married Mary Kavanaugh Oldham in 1882. Her brother William Kavanaugh Oldham moved to Arkansas in 1885 and later entered politics himself, serving as acting governor for a brief time in 1913. A younger brother, Kies Oldham, served as Eagle's personal secretary during his time as governor.

Career
Eagle was appointed deputy sheriff of Prairie County, Arkansas, in 1859, a position he held until the start of the American Civil War. Eagle enlisted in the Confederate States Army and rose to the rank of colonel. He served with the 5th Arkansas Infantry and the 2nd Arkansas Mounted Rifles. He campaigned with the Army of Tennessee and fought in most of that army's campaigns from the initial battles in Kentucky all the way to the Battle of Nashville. Eagle was wounded during the Atlanta Campaign.

At the conclusion of the war, Eagle attended Mississippi College for less than one year but was forced to withdraw due to illness. He studied for the ministry and was ordained as a Baptist preacher.

Eagle served as a member of the Arkansas House of Representatives from 1873 to 1878. He supported Baxter during the Brooks–Baxter War. Eagle served as speaker of the house in 1875. 

Eagle was elected Governor of Arkansas in 1888, and was reelected for a second term in 1890. The Eagle administration concerned itself with attracting immigration and support for education. Eagle was sympathetic to women's suffrage and once welcomed Susan B. Anthony to the state though he did not provide active political support.

Eagle served on the state capitol commission but was fired by Governor Jeff Davis for allegedly campaigning for an opponent of Davis. Davis was opposed to the construction of the new capitol building.

Ministry 
In 1880 he became president of the Arkansas Baptist Convention until 1904. In 1902 he became president of the Southern Baptist Convention until 1904.

Death
Eagle died at his home in Little Rock, Arkansas, of heart failure, on December 20, 1904. He is buried at the historic Mount Holly Cemetery in Little Rock.

See also
List of Southern Baptist Convention affiliated people
Southern Baptist Convention Presidents

References

External links
 Encyclopedia of Arkansas History & Culture entry: James Philip Eagle

1837 births
1904 deaths
19th-century American politicians
19th-century American clergy
Baptists from Tennessee
Baptists from Arkansas
Burials at Mount Holly Cemetery
Confederate States Army officers
Mississippi College alumni
Democratic Party governors of Arkansas
Speakers of the Arkansas House of Representatives
Democratic Party members of the Arkansas House of Representatives
People from Maury County, Tennessee
People from Prairie County, Arkansas
People of Arkansas in the American Civil War
Southern Baptist Convention presidents
Southern Baptist ministers